Ernest Bean (17 April 1866 – 22 March 1939) was an Australian cricketer. He played eight first-class cricket matches for Victoria between 1888 and 1906. He was also a patron of the Victorian Cricket Association.

See also
 List of Victoria first-class cricketers

References

External links
 

1866 births
1939 deaths
Australian cricketers
Victoria cricketers
Sportspeople from Ballarat
Australian cricket administrators